The Hong Kong national rugby sevens team is a regular participant in the Rugby World Cup Sevens. The team's greatest achievements include winning the gold medal at the 2018 Asian Games in Jakarta and winning the Asian Sevens Series in 2012, 2014 and 2016. Their current coach is Paul John. Formerly Dai Rees was the head coach.

The men’s and women’s Hong Kong national sevens teams were granted elite sport status by the Hong Kong Sports Institute on 1 April 2013, which means the HKRFU national sevens teams receive an annual stipend to be distributed to qualified players from the target teams.

In November 2013, former Wales sevens coach Gareth Baber took over as head of the men's rugby sevens programme at the Hong Kong Sports Institute. At the same time, Dai Rees was promoted to be the HKRFU's head of technical development and performance.

Tournament history

Rugby World Cup Sevens

Asian Games

Current squad
Squad to 2021 Canada Sevens:

Max Woodward (Captain)
Michael Coverdale
Liam Herbert
Jamie Hood
Hugo Stiles
Max Denmark
Cado Lee
Callum McCullough
Russell Webb
Seb Brien
Harry Sayers
James Christie

Player records

World Rugby Sevens Series 
As of 27 September 2021, or after the 2021 Canada Sevens

Most appearances 

 Rowan Varty – 47
 Carl Murray – 39 
Ricky Cheuk – 39 
Andrew Chambers – 38
 Jamie Hood – 37

Most points 

 Carl Murray – 139
 Keith Robertson – 135
 Rowan Varty – 105
 Matthew Reede – 90
 Ricky Cheuk – 75

Most tries 

 Rowan Varty – 21
 Matthew Reede – 18
 Keith Robertson – 15
 Ricky Cheuk – 15
 Tom McQueen – 13

Most conversions 

 Carl Murray – 48
 Keith Robertson – 30
 Russell Webb – 19
 Nigel D'Arce – 17
 Jamie Hood – 16

Most tackles 

 Max Woodward – 42
 Liam Herbert – 32
 Jamie Hood – 31
 Cado Lee – 30
 Michael Coverdale – 28

Honours
2018 Asian Games Gold Medal
2014 Asian Games Silver Medal
2013 China National Games Silver Medal
2010 Asian Games Silver Medal
2009 East Asian Games Silver Medal
2011, 2013, 2015, 2017, 2018 Asian Sevens Series Runner-Up
2012, 2014, 2016 Asian Sevens Series Champions

See also
 Hong Kong Sevens

References

Rugby union in Hong Kong
Sevens
National rugby sevens teams